Letopolis (Greek: Λητοῦς Πόλις) was an ancient Egyptian city, the capital of the second nome of Lower Egypt. Its Egyptian name was Khem 𓋊𓐍𓐝𓂜𓊖𓉐 (ḫm), and the modern site of its remains is known as Ausim (from ). The city was a center of worship of the deity Khenty-irty or Khenty-khem, a form of the god Horus. The site and its deity are mentioned in texts from as far back as the Old Kingdom (c. 2686–2181 BC), and a temple to the god probably stood there very early in Egyptian history. The only known monuments at the site, however, date to the reigns of pharaohs from the Late Period (664–332 BC): Necho II, Psamtik II, Hakor, and Nectanebo I.

In popular culture 
Letopolis is depicted in the 2017 video game Assassin's Creed Origins, set during the Ptolemaic Era of Egypt.

See also
 List of ancient Egyptian towns and cities

References

Archaeological sites in Egypt
Former populated places in Egypt
Nile Delta
Cities in ancient Egypt